The Tek Sing (Chinese, "True Star") was a large three-masted Chinese ocean-going junk which sank on February 6, 1822, in an area of the South China Sea known as the Belvidere Shoals. The vessel was 50 meters in length, 10 meters wide and had a burthen of about a thousand tons. Its tallest mast was estimated to be  in height. The ship was manned by a crew of 200 and carried approximately 1600 passengers. The great loss of life associated with the sinking has led to the Tek Sing being referred to in modern times as the "Titanic of the East".
It is one of the few "Asian vessels discovered in Southeast Asia [whose name is known]"; generally, neither the name nor the date is known. The Tek Sing is an exception." Generally, shipwrecks are named either after a landmark or location near which they or the cargo they held were found.

Sinking
Sailing from the port of Amoy (now Xiamen in Fujian, China), the Tek Sing was bound for Batavia, Dutch East Indies (now Jakarta, Indonesia) laden with a large cargo of porcelain goods and 1,600 Chinese immigrants. After a month of sailing, the Tek Sing'''s captain, Io Tauko, decided to attempt a shortcut through the Gaspar Strait between the Bangka-Belitung Islands, and ran aground on a reef.

The next morning, February 7, the English East Indiaman , captained by James Pearl and sailing from Indonesia to Borneo, passed through the Gaspar Strait. The ship encountered debris from the sunk Chinese vessel and an enormous number of survivors. The English ship managed to rescue about 190 of the survivors. Another 18 persons were saved by a wangkang, a small Chinese junk captained by Jalang Lima. This Chinese vessel may have been sailing in tandem with the Tek Sing, but had avoided the reefs.

Discovery
On May 12, 1999, British marine salvor Michael Hatcher discovered the wreck of the Tek Sing in an area of the South China Sea north of Java, east of Sumatra and south of Singapore.

Cargo
Hatcher's crew raised about 350,000 pieces of the ship's cargo in what is described as the largest sunken cache of Chinese porcelain ever recovered. 
The bulk of ceramics were Chinese blue-and-white common tableware, consisting of bowls, tea cups and the like, made in the kilns of Dehua, China. Dehua was famous earlier for its blanc-de-Chine pure-white figurines, but during the 18th and 19th centuries began to mass-produce such pieces for the local markets. At a talk that Captain Hatcher gave to the Southeast Asian Ceramic Society in Singapore on 4 October 2000, he noted that the ceramics "had not been made for the European markets—shapes and patterns were not adapted to European taste, but are genuinely Chinese." A number of earlier Longquan ceramics (celadons) were also found, but Hatcher believed that they were probably the personal possessions of one or more passengers given their limited numbers and the fact that they were found separate from the main bulk cargo.

Casualties
Human remains were also found, but they were not disturbed as most of Hatcher's crew, being Indonesian and Chinese, believed that bad luck would befall any who disturbed the dead.

According to UNESCO's Silk Road Programme listing of shipwrecks, "The Tek Sing wreck could have given testimony to one of the biggest catastrophes in the history of seafaring: the sinking of this large junk, that occurred on February 1822 on a journey between the port of Amoy (now Xiamen, China) and Batavia, Dutch East Indies (now Jakarta, Indonesia), took about 1,500 people—mostly Chinese immigrants—to the bottom of the sea."

See also
Sinking of the Titanic
Marine disasters
Archaeology of shipwrecks
Marine salvage
Vũng Tàu shipwreck

References

Further reading

 

Archaeology of shipwrecks
Shipwrecks in the South China Sea
Maritime incidents in February 1822
1822 in Asia
Bangka Belitung Islands
1822 in China
1822 in the Dutch East Indies
1999 archaeological discoveries
Ships of China
1822 disasters in Asia